Albert Huggins (born June 27, 1997) is an American football defensive tackle for the New Orleans Saints of the National Football League (NFL). After playing college football for Clemson, he was signed by the Houston Texans as an undrafted free agent in 2019. He also played for the New England Patriots, Philadelphia Eagles, and Minnesota Vikings.

Professional career

Houston Texans
Huggins signed with the Houston Texans as an undrafted free agent on May 10, 2019. He was waived during final roster cuts on August 31, 2019, but was signed to the team's practice squad on September 2.

Philadelphia Eagles
On October 21, 2019, Huggins was signed by the Philadelphia Eagles off the Texans' practice squad. He was waived after playing in four games on November 30, 2019.

New England Patriots
On December 2, 2019, Huggins was claimed off waivers by the New England Patriots. He was waived on December 7, 2019.

Philadelphia Eagles (second stint)
On December 10, 2019, Huggins was signed to the Philadelphia Eagles practice squad. He signed a reserve/future contract with the Eagles on January 6, 2020. He was waived on July 26, 2020.

Houston Texans (second stint)
On July 27, 2020, Huggins was claimed off waivers by the Houston Texans. He was waived on August 31, 2020.

Detroit Lions 
Huggins was claimed off waivers by the Detroit Lions on September 1, 2020, but was waived four days later.

Minnesota Vikings
On September 8, 2020, Huggins was signed to the Minnesota Vikings practice squad. He was released on October 9, 2020.

Detroit Lions (second stint)
On October 19, 2020, Huggins was signed to the Detroit Lions practice squad. He was released on October 29, and re-signed to the practice squad two days later. He was elevated to the active roster on November 25 and January 2, 2021, for the team's weeks 12 and 17 games against the Houston Texans and Minnesota Vikings, and reverted to the practice squad after each game.

New Orleans Saints
On May 6, 2021, Huggins signed with the New Orleans Saints. He was waived on August 31, 2021 and re-signed to the practice squad. Huggins was signed to the active roster on September 11, 2021. He was waived on October 25 and re-signed to the practice squad. He was promoted to the active roster on December 2.

On August 30, 2022, Huggins was placed on injured reserve.

References

External links
 Houston Texans bio
 Clemson Tigers football bio

1997 births
Living people
People from Orangeburg, South Carolina
Players of American football from South Carolina
Orangeburg-Wilkinson High School alumni
American football defensive tackles
Clemson Tigers football players
Houston Texans players
Philadelphia Eagles players
New England Patriots players
Detroit Lions players
Minnesota Vikings players
New Orleans Saints players